The 1994–95 NBA season was the 76ers 46th season in the National Basketball Association, and 32nd season in Philadelphia. The 76ers had the sixth pick in the 1994 NBA draft, and selected Sharone Wright out of Clemson University. During the off-season, the team signed free agents Scott Williams, Jeff Grayer, then signed Willie Burton during the first month of the regular season. Under new head coach John Lucas, the Sixers struggled losing six of their first seven games. After a 10–16 start to the season, they went on a nine-game losing streak between December and January, as Jeff Malone only played just 19 games due to a sprained ankle, averaging 18.4 points per game. After holding a 14–34 record at the All-Star break, the Sixers posted an eight-game losing streak in March, and finished sixth in the Atlantic Division with a 24–58 record. 

Dana Barros averaged 20.6 points, 7.5 assists and 1.8 steals per game, while shooting .464 in three-point field goal percentage, and .899 in free throw percentage, and was named Most Improved Player of the Year, He was also selected for the 1995 NBA All-Star Game. In addition, Clarence Weatherspoon averaged 18.1 points, 6.9 rebounds and 1.5 steals per game, while Burton contributed 15.3 points per game, Wright provided the team with 11.4 points, 6.0 rebounds and 1.3 blocks per game, and was selected to the NBA All-Rookie Second Team, and second-year star Shawn Bradley played a full season, averaging 9.5 points, 8.0 rebounds and 3.3 blocks per game. Grayer contributed 8.3 points per game in only just 47 games, and Williams provided with 6.4 points and 6.3 rebounds per game. 

Following the season, Barros departed and signed as a free agent with the Boston Celtics, while Burton and Grayer were both released to free agency, and first round draft pick B.J. Tyler left in the 1995 NBA Expansion Draft. For this season, the 76ers changed their uniforms adding side panels to their jerseys and shorts, which remained in use until 1997.

Offseason

Draft picks

Roster

Roster Notes
Center Shawn Bradley was raised in the U.S., but played for Germany internationally.

Regular season

Season standings

z - clinched division title
y - clinched division title
x - clinched playoff spot

Record vs. opponents

Game log

Regular season

|- align="center" bgcolor="#ffcccc"
| 2
| November 5, 1994
| @ Orlando
| L 107–122
| 
| 
| 
| Orlando Arena
| 0–2
|- align="center" bgcolor="#ffcccc"
| 6
| November 12, 1994
| Orlando
| L 103–116
| 
| 
| 
| CoreStates Spectrum
| 1–5

|- align="center" bgcolor="#ffcccc"
| 17
| December 9, 1994
| Indiana
| L 88–94
| 
| 
| 
| CoreStates Spectrum
| 7–10

|- align="center" bgcolor="#ffcccc"
| 34
| January 14, 1995
| @ Orlando
| L 70–91
| 
| 
| 
| Orlando Arena
| 10–24
|- align="center" bgcolor="#ffcccc"
| 42
| January 28, 1995
| @ Indiana
| L 103–106 (OT)
| 
| 
| 
| Market Square Arena
| 12–30

|- align="center"
|colspan="9" bgcolor="#bbcaff"|All-Star Break
|- style="background:#cfc;"
|- bgcolor="#bbffbb"
|- align="center" bgcolor="#ffcccc"
| 50
| February 17, 1995
| @ Orlando
| L 83–129
| 
| 
| 
| Orlando Arena
| 14–36

|- align="center" bgcolor="#ffcccc"
| 60
| March 10, 1995
| San Antonio
| L 94–100
| 
| 
| 
| CoreStates Spectrum
| 17–43
|- align="center" bgcolor="#ffcccc"
| 62
| March 14, 19957:30p.m. EST
| Houston
| L 107–136
| Barros (50)
| Weatherspoon (8)
| Barros (8)
| CoreStates Spectrum11,484
| 17–45
|- align="center" bgcolor="#ffcccc"
| 63
| March 16, 1995
| @ San Antonio
| L 86–112
| 
| 
| 
| Alamodome
| 17–46
|- align="center" bgcolor="#ffcccc"
| 65
| March 19, 19953:30p.m. EST
| @ Houston
| L 103–114
| Weatherspoon (25)
| Bradley (12)
| Barros (10)
| The Summit16,611
| 17–48
|- align="center" bgcolor="#ffcccc"
| 68
| March 25, 1995
| Indiana
| L 75–84
| 
| 
| 
| CoreStates Spectrum
| 18–50

|- align="center" bgcolor="#ccffcc"
| 75
| April 8, 1995
| Orlando
| W 109–99
| 
| 
| 
| CoreStates Spectrum
| 21–54
|- align="center" bgcolor="#ffcccc"
| 80
| April 19, 1995
| @ Indiana
| L 91–103
| 
| 
| 
| Market Square Arena
| 23–57

Player statistics

Awards and honors
 Dana Barros, Most Improved Player of the Year
 Sharone Wright, NBA All-Rookie Team, Second Team

Transactions
The 76ers were involved in the following transactions during the 1994–95 season.

Trades

Free agents

Additions

Subtractions

Player Transactions Citation:

References

See also
1994-95 NBA season

Philadelphia 76ers seasons
Philadelphia
Philadelphia
Philadelphia